Keily is an English surname. Notable people with this surname include:

 Arthur Keily (1921–2016), British marathon runner
 Dan Keily (1892–1967), Australian Australian rules football player
 Jack Keily (1898–1966), Australian Australian rules football player
 John Keily (1854–1928), Irish Catholic prelate